The yellow-headed dwarf gecko or dwarf yellow-headed gecko (Lygodactylus luteopicturatus) is a small species of dwarf gecko found in the rocky areas of southern Kenya, Somalia (maybe as an introduced species), eastern Tanzania, and Zanzibar. The tail length can be equal to the length of the body from snout to the anus (SVL or Snout-Vent Length).

The yellow-headed dwarf gecko has a defense mechanism called tail autotomy, where they drop their tails to flee to safety when they are attacked by a predator. However, tail autotomy only gives the gecko an immediate benefit to escape because an autotomized gecko is slower without its tail and has difficulty running on vertical surfaces.

References

 Broadley, D. G. & HOWELL, K. M. (1991). A checklist of the reptiles of Tanzania, with synoptic keys. Syntarsus, 1: 1—70
 Spawls, S.; Howell, K.; Drewes, R.C. & Ashe, J. (2001). A field guide to the reptiles of East Africa. Academic Press, 543 pp

Lygodactylus
Reptiles described in 1964